The Progressives is a social-democratic political party in Latvia. The party was founded on 25 February 2017. Since 4 September 2021 its leaders have been  and Atis Švinka. The Progressives have 11 seats on Riga City Council and 10 seats in the Saeima but do not hold any seats in the European Parliament. The party is currently in opposition to the second Kariņš cabinet.

History
The party is a successor of a social-democratic NGO of the same name that was founded on 26 March 2011 and was led by Ansis Dobelis. The Progressives participated in the 2017 Latvian municipal elections in four municipalities. In two of these, Aizpute and Mārupe Municipality, they won seats on the local councils.

The Progressives participated in the 2018 parliamentary election. Prior to the election, the party declined to join the liberal alliance Development/For!. The Progressives argued that staying out of the alliance was necessary to ensure that the party's left-wing policies and high standard for political donations were not compromised. The Progressives had a unique gender parity principle on their ballots, with all election list leaders being women. The party did not win any seats in the Saeima, receiving only 2.6% of the vote, but qualifying for state funding of €15,000 per year for surpassing the 2% threshold.

In May 2019, the Progressives participated in the 2019 European Parliament election. They ran with the slogan "More Europe" on a federalist platform, with their main proposals concerning social policy and green politics. Although polling at 4.5% in March and 4.3% in April they ultimately received only 2.9% of the vote. After the election, on 28 May, Roberts Putnis resigned as party leader. That year they also organised a small protest against the Turkish offensive into north-eastern Syria in front of the Turkish embassy in Riga, as well as pickets against a labour law reform that was deemed to degrade workers rights and weaken labour unions.

In early 2020, the Riga City Council was dismissed and a snap election was called. Due to technicalities and the COVID-19 pandemic, the election was postponed until 29 August. The Progressives formed a common electoral list with the liberal Development/For! alliance, claiming that ideological differences are not as important at the local level and stressed the importance of toppling Riga's ruling SDP Harmony–Honor to serve Riga coalition that had been involved in multiple corruption scandals. The common electoral list won the election with 18 out of 60 seats, of which nine were members of the Progressives and 2 were independent city activists with ties to the Progressives. The Progressives' member Mārtiņš Kossovičs chairs the common City Council group of Development/For! and the Progressives, Edmunds Cepurītis is the chair of the housing and environment committee, and Viesturs Kleinbergs is the chair of the social issues committee.

In June 2022, the Progressives were accepted as a candidate member of the European Green Party.

In the October 2022 parliamentary election, the Progressives won 6.2% of the vote, entering the Saeima with 10 seats.

Ideology and platform
The Progressives have stated that one of their main goals is implementing the Nordic welfare model in Latvia (the party's political programme is even called "Turning towards the Nordic countries"). The party's principles include implementation of a progressive tax system, responsibility towards the environment, fighting against corruption and the shadow economy, an active state role in the economy, dropping GDP as the main measure of development (in favour of others which take the well-being of society into account such as the Happiness index), gender and LGBT equality.

Nationality and identity 
The party wishes to abolish Latvia's non-citizen status, held by just under 10% of the national population, by gradually granting non-citizens citizenship status. As an initial measure, the Progressives support a policy of automatically granting Latvian citizenship to any child born to permanent residents, regardless of whether or not they have citizenship themselves or whether they were born before or after Latvia's independence. The party is supportive of dual citizenship among the Latvian diaspora. It supports further state funding for Latvian-language education (as well as a 0% VAT on books published in Latvian) and the granting of free Latvian courses for returning migrants and asylum seekers, while at the same time also supporting minority languages in the school curriculum as a form of cultural diversity. They define themselves as inclusive and oppose ethnic segregation and discrimination.

Foreign policy 
The Progressives subscribe to a Pro-European ideology and support Latvia's membership in NATO. They are in favour of forming a common EU army, and believe that the EU should become a United Nations Security Council permanent member state, while at the same time desiring to abolish permanent members' singular veto power.

The party condemns what they dub the "aggressive policy of the Russian ruling regime", while at the same time expressing a desire for improved relations with both Russia and Belarus, which they opine would happen through "democratic processes" in these nations. They do not recognise the annexation of Crimea by the Russian Federation and called for an investigation into the "human rights violations in Russian-occupied Crimea".

Economy 
The Progressives call on the Latvian state to abandon neoliberal economic policies and the "Russian-style" of restraint toward economic interventionism, instead calling for active state participation in the national economy. They are in favour of trade diversification aimed at reducing Latvia's dependence on Russian cargo and advocate for state funding for small and medium-sized enterprises, start-ups and companies that adhere to their social and environmental criteria.

Election results

Legislative elections

European Parliament

Riga City Council

References

External links
Official website

2017 establishments in Latvia
Political parties established in 2017
Green political parties in Latvia
Pro-European political parties in Latvia
Social democratic parties in Latvia
Progressive parties